Cochylimorpha meridiolana is a species of moth of the family Tortricidae. It is found in Central Asia (Transcaspia: Tura, Kuldscha, Osch, Samarkand, Mesopotamia, Alai, Turkestan).

References

Moths described in 1894
Cochylimorpha
Moths of Asia